Bagerdan-e Olya (also Romanized as Bāgerdān-e ‘Olyā; also known as Bāgerdān) is a village in Mangur-e Sharqi Rural District, Khalifan District, Mahabad County, West Azerbaijan Province, Iran. At the 2006 census, its population was 117, in 23 families.

References 

Populated places in Mahabad County